Barmera is a town and locality in South Australia.

Barmera  may also refer to.

Barmera is the official alternative name for Lake Bonney Riverland, a lake in South Australia
District Council of Barmera, a former local government area in South Australia
Barmera railway line, a former railway line in South Australia

See also
Berri Barmera Council
Barmera-Monash Football Club